Ruslan Valentinovich Sviridov (Russian: Русла́н Валенти́нович Свири́дов) (born January 18, 1973, in Tambov) is a Russian pianist.

Biography
In 1987-1991 studied at Tambov Musical College with Natalia Kolpakova. In 1991-1998 he studied at the Moscow Conservatory in the class of Professor Victor Merzhanov (piano), graduating with distinction.

Sviridov has won many piano competitions in Russia. He achieved international recognition as a pianist in 1994 when he won Grand Prix and a first prize at the Tortona International Musical Competition in Italy. In 1995, he was a prizewinner in the Kingsville International Piano Competition in Kingsville, Texas (USA) and several competitions in Italy.

Widely known among music lovers, Sviridov has given many recitals in Russia, Europe, and the United States. His recordings show his extensive repertoire. In 1996 he formed "Piano Synergy Duo" together with his wife, Irina Khovanskaya. The duo had released three CDs to date.

Sviridov moved to San Antonio, Texas (United States) in 1998. He currently resides in Toronto, Canada.

References
An article about Ruslan Sviridov on Tambov Rachmaninov Institute's web site (in Russian)
Darius Milhaud's "Le Boeuf sur le Toit" discography, CD
Recordings on Amazon.com

1973 births
Russian classical pianists
Male classical pianists
People from Tambov
Musicians from Toronto
Living people
21st-century classical pianists
21st-century Canadian male musicians